USS Huron was an iron-hulled gunboat of the United States Navy. She was a screw steamer with full-rig auxiliary sail, built by John Roach & Sons in Chester, Pennsylvania from 1873 to 1875 and commissioned at Philadelphia Navy Yard on 15 November 1875.

Service history
Huron arrived on 11 December 1875 for duty at the Norfolk Navy Yard, and spent the next two years cruising in the Caribbean and the Gulf of Mexico. She stopped at Veracruz and Key West on her first cruise, returning to Port Royal on 4 August 1876 and visited many Caribbean and Venezuelan ports from March–June 1877.

Loss
After repairs at New York Navy Yard in August, the ship sailed to Hampton Roads, and departed on 23 November 1877 for a scientific cruise on the coast of Cuba. Soon after her departure, Huron ran aground off Nags Head, North Carolina in heavy weather, and was wrecked shortly after 1 a.m. next morning. For a time, her crew worked in relatively little danger, attempting to free their ship, but she soon heeled over, carrying 98 officers and men to their deaths. Of the fatalities 83 remains were recovered and buried; of which the remains of 8 officers and 61 men were identified while 14 others who could not be identified.

Today, the Huron wreck can be dived (Scuba or free dived) from shore.  The bow of the wreck GPS coordinates are 35.97751, -75.63092 which is around 250 yard swim from shore.  The wreck is often marked with a buoy during the summer months.

References

External links

Contemporary Newspaper accounts of the loss of the USN Huron
Proceedings of Court of Inquiry on the Loss of the Huron, ancestry.com.

Shipwrecks on the National Register of Historic Places in North Carolina
Steamships of the United States Navy
1875 ships
Alert-class gunboats
Maritime incidents in November 1877
Shipwrecks of the Carolina coast
National Register of Historic Places in Dare County, North Carolina